Rafaâ Chtioui (born 26 January 1986) is a Tunisian road bicycle racer who last rode for UCI Continental team .

As a junior in 2004, Chtioui finished second in the junior road race world championships. He was beaten by Roman Kreuziger in a two-man sprint after Chtioui established a breakaway on the final descent of the race.

Chtioui represented his country at the 2008 Summer Olympics in the Road Race, ultimately finishing in 87th place.

From 2014 to 2016, Chtioui competed for UCI Continental squad . That year he won a stage and the overall victory at the Jelajah Malaysia, as well as winning the Tunisian national road race championships. In 2015, he won his biggest victories to date by winning the general classification as well as the first and second stages of the La Tropicale Amissa Bongo, a UCI 2.1-ranked race.

Major results

2004
 2nd  Road race, UCI Junior Road World Championships
2005
 2nd  Time trial, African Road Championships
 Mediterranean Games
7th Road race
8th Time trial
2006
 1st Stage 3 Tour du Maroc
 7th Time trial, African Road Championships
2007
 1st  Time trial, Arab Road Championships
 1st  Time trial, Pan Arab Games
 1st Stage 3 Tour des Pays de Savoie
 1st Stage 5 (ITT) Tour de l'Avenir
 4th Overall Tour d'Egypte
1st Stage 1
 6th Overall Tour du Maroc
1st Stage 4
 6th Overall Tour des Aéroports
1st Stage 3
2008
 1st International Grand Prix Al-Khor
 6th Overall Tour d'Egypte
 7th International Grand Prix Messaeed
 8th La Côte Picarde
 9th International Grand Prix Losail
2009
 1st  Time trial, Arab Road Championships
 1st Stage 2 Tour de Singkarak
 1st Stage 5 Tour de Serbie
 4th H.H. Vice President Cup
 5th Overall Tour de East Java
 6th Overall Jelajah Malaysia
 10th Overall International Presidency Tour
2010
 1st  Road race, National Road Championships
 8th Gran Premio Città di Misano – Adriatico
2011
 1st  Time trial, Pan Arab Games
2012
 African Road Championships
2nd  Team time trial
6th Time trial
 2nd La Roue Tourangelle
 3rd Overall Ronde de l'Oise
 10th Volta Limburg Classic
2013
 National Road Championships
1st  Road race
1st  Time trial
 Challenge du Prince
1st Trophée de l'Anniversaire
2nd Trophée Princier
2014
 1st  Road race, National Road Championships
 1st  Overall Jelajah Malaysia
1st Stage 1
2015
 National Road Championships
1st  Road race
1st  Time trial
 1st  Overall La Tropicale Amissa Bongo
1st Stages 1 & 2
 1st Stage 2 Tour of Japan
 1st Stage 4 Tour of Taihu Lake
 4th Time trial, African Games
 4th Overall Sharjah International Cycling Tour
 African Road Championships
6th Time trial
10th Road race
 10th Overall Tour d'Egypte

References

External links
Europcar Profile

1986 births
Living people
Tunisian male cyclists
Olympic cyclists of Tunisia
Cyclists at the 2008 Summer Olympics
Competitors at the 2015 African Games
20th-century Tunisian people
21st-century Tunisian people